Pratap Malla (1624–74 A.D.) was a Malla king and the eighth King of Kantipur from 1641 until his death in 1674. He attempted to unify Kathmandu Valley by conquering Lalitpur and Bhaktapur, but failed in the effort. He was successful in extending and securing the borders of Kantipur and was responsible for the monopoly over trade with Tibet. The resulting prosperity was responsible for the construction of majority of the buildings around Durbar Square during his reign. His reign is seen as a cultural and economical high point of the Malla dynasty.

A statue of Pratap Malla is found standing on a column facing the palace in the square. His image can also be seen in the niche above the Hanuman Dhoka Palace gate. The niche above the gate is Krishna in his ferocious tantric aspect, flanked by more gentle, amorous Krishna surrounded by gopinis, and by King Pratap Malla playing a lute, and his queen.

Life
He was born to his Maithali origin mother and a Malla origin father Lakshmi Narasinha Malla. Even when his father was alive, Pratap Malla had the experience of administration. He imprisoned his father on the grounds of insanity and sat on the throne in 1641 A.D. He was a very ambitious king.

Marriage and children

Pratap Malla had two queens: the first being a Maithali lady of Southern Nepal and the second being a sister of Zil-gnon dbang-rgyal rdo-rje, a prominent Tibetan Buddhist guru, who had served as an advisor to him. Some modern historians have given him the reputation for being lewd and maintaining a harem. He is also alleged to have raped a virgin girl, which ultimately resulted in her death. Pratap Malla is said to have repented this act so much so that he wanted to absolve himself of his sins and consulted the wise and learned men on the matter. Acting on their suggestions, he set up hundreds of Lingas at Pashupati and installed a statue of his own with his two queens. He also performed Koti Hom, weighed gold on one scale and himself on the other and gave it away in charity. In order to commemorate the occasion, he also raised a pillar on the southern gate of Pashupati, and established a grazing ground near the area.

Pratap Malla had five sons: Bhupendra Malla, Chakrabartendra, Nripendra, Mahipatendra, and Parthibendra. He wanted his sons to have experience in the administration of the country even during his own lifetime. With this aim in view, he made them rule over the country for one year in turn. But unfortunately, his second son Chakrabartendra Malla died the day after he took over the administration of the country.

Relation with Lalitpur and Bhaktapur
He often fought with Lalitpur and Bhaktapur to annex them to his kingdom but could not succeed. He tried to play the kings of Lalitpur and Bhaktapur against each other. Sometimes he sided with Bhaktapur and posed a menace to Lalitpur. Sometimes he sided with Lalitpur and fell upon Bhaktapur. His main aim was to annex Lalitpur to Kathmandu. But his aim was not fulfilled as the king of Lalitpur had the king of Gorkha, Ram Shah, as his ally. Moreover, Shree Nivas, son of Siddhi Nara Singha was no less inferior to Pratap Malla in courage and diplomacy. In 1634 A.D., when Siddhi Nara Singha Malla was engaged in performing Koti Hom, Pratap Malla availing himself of the opportunity, made a surprise attack on Patan and conquered some of the places important from the strategic point of view. Dambar Shah, son of Ram Shah had come with a contingent to help Siddhi Nara Singh Malla, but his troops were waylaid and put to rout. Pratap Malla gave a lot of trouble to Narendra Malla, King of Bhaktapur. He made Narendra Malla pay tribute to him in the form of elephants. Later, again he sided with Shree Niwas Malla and laid a siege on Bhaktapur. He plundered Bhaktapur and carried away many valuables. But when Lalitpur sided with Bhaktapur, Pratap Malla signed a treaty with Bhaktapur.

Patronage of art and literature

Pratap Malla was a lover of literature. He himself was a poet. He gave himself the title of "Kavindra." Kavindra means "the King of poets". He was tolerant of all religions. He was fond of building temples. He set up an image of Hanuman beside his palace. Since then, the palace is called "Hanuman Dhoka". Besides this, he built a temple of Krishna with the image of Kala Bhairav in front of Hanuman Dhoka and a temple of Guheshwari. He offered a gold umbrella to Pashupatinath temple. He had great respect for Buddhism. He introduced Seto Machchhindranath Jatra.

Death
Pratap Malla died a sudden death. While he was watching the religious dance of Harisiddhi, he fell down unconscious and died. After ruling for 33 years, he died in 1674. During his reign for thirty-three years (1641 A.D. to 1674 A.D.) there was peace and prosperity at home and no danger from outside. Trade with India and China made Nepal prosperous. Art and literature flourished. Kings of Bhaktapur, Lalitpur and other neighbouring kingdoms did not dare to invade Kantipur. Just as Muslim culture reached its height in the time of Shah Jahan, so did Nepalese culture reached its height in the time of Pratap Malla.

Relations with Tibet

The 16th and 17th centuries were a crucial period in the relations between Nepal and Tibet. By 1600, Tibet was in a state of near chaos as a result of the struggle between competing Buddhist sects and the more basic regional conflict between the two central Tibetan provinces, of which Lhasa and Shigatse are the political centers. The powerful figure of the Fifth Dalai Lama, the head of the Gelugpa (yellow) sect of Tibetan Buddhism, gradually gained control, both spiritual and temporal, over Tibet in the first half of the 17th century, with the valuable assistance of the Khoshote Mongols.

During this critical period, two ambitious kings, Ram Shah of Gorkha (1606–33) and Pratap Malla of Kantipur, took advantage of Tibetan weakness to seize control of the vital border-pass areas through which most of the trans-Himalayan trade passed. Ram Shah's incursions into Tibet occurred toward the end of his reign, probably from 1625 to 1630, after he had conquered the intervening territory between Gorkha and Kirong district in Tibet. The first Gorkhali invading force was defeated, and the severed heads of the two commanders were sent to the Panchen Lama at Shigatse. Ram Shah led another army into Kerong area, defeated the Tibetans at Khinchog and advanced as far as Kukurghat. He reached an agreement with the Tibetans under which the boundary line between Gorkha and Tibet was drawn at Kukurghat, thus giving Ram Shah control over one of the main channels of communication between Nepal and Tibet.

This posed a serious problem for Kathmandu merchant community, which normally used the route through Kirong in their trade with Tibet. Pratap malla decided against contending directly with the Gorkha ruler for control of Kerong, but sought instead to bring the second major trade route, via Kuti, under his authority. An army commanded by his brother, Bhim Malla, was sent to Kuti in the 1630s and again in the period between 1645 and 1650. On the second occasion, Bhim Malla overran the border district and advanced some distance toward Shigatse before he was met by the deputies of the Dalai Lama, with whom he negotiated a peace settlement.

The terms of this treaty were, in summary:
 Kathmandu was granted joint authority with Tibet over the border towns of Kuti and Kerong.
 The Newari merchant community of Kathmandu valley was permitted to establish 32 trading houses at Lhasa.
 The Kathmandu court was given the right to post a representative (Nayo) at Lhasa.
 Tibet agreed not to impose any charges or customs duties on Newari merchants who were engaged in trade with Tibet.
 Tibet promised to make a token payment in gold and silver annually to Kathmandu.
 It was agreed that Nepal would mint coins for Tibet; Tibet would use these coins internally and would either provide the silver required for their minting or would pay for Nepali coins with gold.
 Tibet agreed that all trade with India, even though conducted by other than Newari merchants, would be channeled through Kathmandu valley in preference to the routes to the east (i.e., via Sikkim, Bhutan or Towang).

Thanks to the treaty, the merchants of Kathmandu valley gained a virtual monopoly over the lucrative trade between India and Tibet, as well as the right to extend their commercial activities to Lhasa. The king of Kathmandu also profited substantially from the process under which he minted coins for the Tibetan government, for he deducted a certain percentage of the silver provided by Lhasa as his fee for this service. These Nepali coins, called "Mahendramalli," were the sole currency in circulation throughout Tibet for more than a century.

European visitors

In the year 1661, Pratap Malla, the then King of Kathmandu received Albert d’Orville and Johann Grueber – a Belgian and an Austrian with open arms into the valley. They were visiting Kathmandu from the imperial Chinese Observatory in Peking via Lhasa, seeking a land route to India. He granted them permission to preach the new religion, but without waiting for permission for a permanent stay, they left for Agra, the headquarters of the Tibet-Hindustan Mission in India. They determined the latitude of Kathmandu to be 27"5', which is low by 37', the actual latitude being 27"42'.

In China Illustrata, by Athanasius Kircher, where the account of their journey is described, the very first description of Nepal is given to the Europeans. Despite the good hospitality shown by the king, the following  unflattering picture of Nepal during the reign of Pratap Malla emerges in the book:

From Nesti is a journey of six days to Cadmendu, the capital of the kingdom of Necbal, situated at 27”5’ North. Here there resides a powerful, but pagan, the king who is not unfriendly to the Christian law... Cities of this kingdom are Cuthi and Nesti. It is the custom of this tribe when drinking to women, for other men or women to pour out a drink of tea or wine three times for the first woman. While drinking, they fix three pieces of butter to the rim of the cup. Later on they fix this butter to their foreheads. They have another custom here, fearsome in its barbarism. When sick people are near death and there is no hope for their recovery, they are thrown out of the house into the ditches of the field full of corpses. There, being exposed to all injuries of nature, these die without any acts of devotion or lamentation. After dying, these are left to be devoured by birds of prey, wolves, dogs, and other creatures. They persuade themselves that it is a uniquely glorious monument for the dead to obtain a sepulchre in the stomachs of living animals. The women of these kingdoms are so ugly that they seem more like devils than humans. For religious reasons they never wash themselves with water, but only with totally rancid oil. Moreover, besides exhaling an intolerable stench, they are so stained by the oil that you would call them ghouls and not humans.

The king showed marked kindness to the fathers, especially because of the telescope, which he had never heard of before, and because of the other scientific instruments shown him. In fact, he was so captivated by these things that he decided to keep the fathers with him, and they would not have been allowed to depart had they not promised to return. If they would do this, he promised to build a house there for our use and the mission work of our order and to provide ample income. He also gave full permission for the Law of Christ to be introduced into his kingdom.

Research however shows no proof of most of these claims. Historians from the Tribhuwan University say that, these false documentation maybe written by the missionaries to portray Christianity in a more glorious fashion by downgrading the religion that was followed in the kingdom portraying it as barbaric.

Legacy

Krishna Temple (Chyasin Dega)

The octagonal Krishna Temple was built in 1648–49 by Pratap Malla, either as a response to rival Siddhinarshingh Malla's Krishna Temple in Patan or as a religious consolation for his earlier failure to conquer that city, or in memory of his two wives, or a combination of all three. The three-tiered traditional Newari building is supported by stone columns around the circumference of the base. The image of Krishna inside the temple is accompanied by his two wives, Satyabhama and Rukmini, all of which, according to a Sanskrit inscription, bear deliberate resemblance to Pratap Malla and his own two queens. Inside are the images of Krishna and two goddesses, which, according to a Sanskrit inscription, are modelled on the king and his two wives.

Pratap Malla's Column
Across from the Krishna Temple, standing on a slightly raised platform in front of the Hanuman Dhoka is the square stone pillar, known as the Pratap Dhvaja. It is topped by a statue of King Pratap Malla, seated with folded hands and surrounded by his two wives and his five (including an infant) sons. He looks towards his private prayer room on the third floor of the Degutaleju Temple. The column was erected in 1670 by Pratap Malla and preceded the similar columns in Patan and Bhaktapur.

Kal Bhairab Statue

North of the Jagannath Temple is the figure of Kala Bhairab. Bhairab is Shiva in his most fearsome aspect, and this huge stone image of the terrifying Kal Bhairab has six arms, wears a garland of skulls and tramples on a corpse, which is symbolic of human ignorance. The figure is said to have been brought to its present location by Pratap Malla, having been found in a field to the north of the city. The image was originally cut from a single stone but the upper left-hand corner has since been repaired. It is said that telling a lie while standing before Kala Bhairab will bring instant death and it was once used as a form of trial by ordeal.

Stone inscription
On the outside of the white wall of Kathmandu Durbar, opposite the Vishnu Temple, is a long low stone inscription to the goddess Kalika written in fifteen different languages, including European languages. Pratap Malla, renowned for his linguistic abilities, set up this inscription on 14 January 1664. A legend tells that milk will flow from the spout in the middle if somebody is able to decipher all fifteen languages.

The account of the wall and the inscription is given by Fr. Giuseppe, writing at the end of eighteenth century:

In a wall of the royal palace of Kathmandu, which is built upon the court before the palace, there is a great stone of a single piece, which is about fifteen feet long, and four or five feet thick: on the top of this great stone there are four square holes at equal distances from each other. In the inside of the wall they pour water into the holes, and in the courtside, each hole having a closed canal, every person may draw water to drink. At the foot of the stone is a large ladder, by which people ascend to drink; but the curiosity of the stone consists in its being quite covered with characters of different languages cut upon it. Some lines contain the characters of the language of the country; others the characters of Tibet, others Persia, others Greece, besides several others of different nations; and in the middle there is a line of Roman characters, which appears in this form AVTOMNE WINTER LHIVERT; but none of the inhabitants have any knowledge how they came there, nor do they know whether or not any European had ever been in Nepal before the missionaries, who arrived there only the beginning of the present century. They are manifestly two French names of seasons, with an English word between them.

The two French names of the seasons are AVTOMNE = autumn and L'HIVERT = winter. The word WINTER could also be winter in German or Dutch.

Rani Pokhari

Ranipokhari lies in the heart of Kathmandu, with about fifteen minutes walk from Kathmandu Durbar Square. Rani Pokhari, meaning Queen's pond, is the artificial square-shaped pond with the temple of Shiva in the middle. The Rani in question was Pratap Malla's queen who in 1667 commissioned its construction in memory of their son, Chakravatendra Malla, who, following his father's abdication in favor of his four sons each of whom would rule for one year, died on the second day of his reign, apparently having been trampled by an elephant.

The water with which the pond was originally filled was taken from fifty-one sacred rivers throughout Nepal and India, thus ensuring its sanctity. The temple in the middle of the  pond has a domed roof reminiscent of classical Indian Mughal architecture and is surmounted by a copper spire. The main image is of the Shiva lingam, but other deities also feature. Four small shrines at each corner contain images of Bhirab, Harishankar, Shakti, and Tarkeshwari. On the southern embankment is a statue of an elephant carrying three passengers on its back, thought to be three of the male members of the Pratap Malla's family, while a fourth person is held in its trunk.

Various myths and legends have come to be associated with Rani Pokhari over the years. It is said to be haunted by ghosts, including one especially seductive female spectre which managed to unnerve even the great Pratap Malla.

The pond is fenced with iron bars, apparently to prevent suicide by drowning, and opened once a year during Bhaitika, the fifth and final day of Tihar.

Gai Jatra

When King Pratap Malla lost his son, his wife, the queen, remained grief-stricken. The king was very sad to see the condition of his beloved queen. The king, in spite of several efforts, could not lessen the grief of his wife. He desperately wanted to see a little smile on her lips; so he announced that anyone who made the queen laugh would be rewarded adequately. During the festival of Gai Jatra, the cow procession was brought before the grief-stricken queen. Then the participants began ridiculing and mocking the important people of the society. Finally, when the social injustices and other evils were highlighted and attacked mercilessly, the queen could not help but smile. The queen laughed and the king instituted a tradition of including jokes, satire, mockery, and lampoon into the Gaijatra celebration. As per the traditions, every family who has lost a relative during that past year participates in a procession through the streets leading a cow. If a cow is unavailable, a young boy dressed as a cow is substituted.

Swayambhunath
In 1614 additions and renovations of Swayambhunath complex were made by Zhamarpa VI during the reign of Pratap Malla. Access from Kathmandu was improved with the construction of a long stairway and a bridge across the Vishnumati.  At the bottom of the 400 stone steps are three painted images symbolizing the Three Precious Jewels of Buddhism, which were erected in 1637 by Pratap Malla and his son, Lakshmandra Singh Malla.

Pratap Malla also placed a large vajra placed in front of the stupa. Flanking the vajra, he also added two white shikhar (spires) temples, known as Anantapur (southeast) and Pratapur (northeast), which were built in 1646 to house the protector deities Bhairab and Bhairabi.

Notes

References
Bindloss, Joe; Holden, Trent; Mayhew, Bradley. (2009). Nepal. Lonely Planet.
Ehrhard, Franz-Karl. "A Forgotten Incarnation Lineage: The Yol-mo-ba sPrul-skus". TIBETAN STUDIES IN HONOUR OF E. GENE SMITH. THE PANDITA AND THE SIDDHA
Fr. Giuseppe. (1799). An account of the kingdom of Nepal. Asiatic Researches. Vol 2. pp. 307–322.
Gyawali, Surya Bikram. (1962). Pratap Malla. Regmi Research Series: Vol 5, Issue 6. pp. 104–111. Retrieved 31 Dec, 2012.
Kircher, Athanasius. (1677). China Illustrata. Translated by Dr. Charles D. Van Tuyl from 1677 original Latin edition. (1986).
Levi, Sylvain. European Documents on Nepal.
Rose, Leo E. (1971). Nepal; strategy for survival. University of California Press.
Shaha, Rishikesh. (1992). Ancient and Medieval Nepal. New Delhi: Manohar. 
Shrestha, D.B.; Singh, C.B. (1972). The History of Ancient and Medieval Nepal, in a nutshell with some comparative traces of foreign history. Kathmandu: HMG Press.
Woodhatch, Tom. (1999). Nepal Handbook. Footprint Travel Guides.

Malla rulers
17th-century Nepalese people
Nepalese Hindus